Eucephalus paucicapitatus is a North American species of flowering plant in the family Asteraceae known by the common name Olympic Mountain aster. It grows on rocky slopes and in subalpine meadows at high elevations in and near Olympic National Park in the US State of Washington, and on Vancouver Island in the Canadian Province of British Columbia.

Eucephalus paucicapitatus is a perennial herb up to 55 cm (22 inches) tall, with a woody caudex. One plant will usually produce 2-4 flower heads per stem. Each head has 7-21 white ray florets surrounding numerous yellow  disc florets. Flowers bloom July to August.

References

External links
Burke Museum of Natural History and Culture, University of Washington, Eucephalus paucicapitatus, Olympic Mountain aster  photos

Astereae
Flora of British Columbia
Flora of Washington (state)
Plants described in 1891
Flora without expected TNC conservation status